Thestorus or Thestoros was a town of the Chalcidice in ancient Macedonia. It probably belonged to the Delian League since it appears in the tribute records of Athens of 422/1 BCE, but appears in no other extant tribute records. It is cited in a fragment of Theopompus preserved by Stephanus of Byzantium, who states it belonged to Thrace.

Its site is in unlocated, but somewhere in Chalcidice close to the territory of Olynthus.

References

Populated places in ancient Macedonia
Former populated places in Greece
Geography of ancient Chalcidice
Members of the Delian League
Lost ancient cities and towns